The Giardino Bardini is an Italian Renaissance garden of the Villa Bardini in the hilly part of Oltrarno, offering fine views of Florence, Italy. Opened only recently to the public, it is one of Florence's well kept secrets.

The garden is composed of three separate areas, each created in a different time period, which adds to the architectural and agricultural diversity.  The park's center contains the grand staircase that was constructed in the 17th century.  On one side of the staircase you can find the Anglo-Chinese garden created in the 19th century.  The other side of the staircase hosts the garden's agricultural park.  The garden boasts many statues and panoramic views over the city. Wildlife in the garden includes rock pigeons, blackbirds and woodpigeons.

Access is gained via the Via de' Bardi, just over the road from the Museo Bardini in the Oltrarno district of the city, although the gardens exit onto the Costa di San Giorgio, onto which the Forte di Belevedere and the Giardino di Boboli connect in turn.

See also
Grandi Giardini Italiani

References

Il giardino Bardini, uno specchio della storia fiorentina, Fondazione parchi monumentali Bardini e Peyron, CD-ROM, Ente Cassa di Risparmio di Firenze, 2001.

External links
Official Villa & Giardino Bardini website
 

Italian Renaissance gardens
Gardens in Florence